was a professional wrestling event promoted by DDT Pro-Wrestling (DDT). The event took place on October 21, 2018, in Tokyo at the Ryōgoku Kokugikan. The event, named after the traditional Japanese cultural festivals, featured twelve matches, two of which were contested for championships. The event aired on Fighting TV Samurai and was the first Peter Pan event to be held in the fall.

Storylines
The Ryōgoku Peter Pan 2018 event featured twelve professional wrestling matches that involved different wrestlers from pre-existing scripted feuds and storylines. Wrestlers portrayed villains, heroes, or less distinguishable characters in the scripted events that built tension and culminated in a wrestling match or series of matches.

By winning the King of DDT tournament on August 26, Daisuke Sasaki earned a title match in the main event against KO-D Openweight Champion Danshoku Dino.

Event
First on the undercard was a ten-man Rumble rules match. Amongst the participants was a fake Tiger Mask V.

The second match of the undercard was Mina Shirakawa's first DDT match and featured six Tokyo Joshi Pro Wrestling talents.

On the main card, Disaster Box (Toru Owashi, Kazuki Hirata and Yuki Ueno) challenged Damnation (Soma Takao, Tetsuya Endo and Mad Paulie) for the KO-D 6-Man Tag Team Championship.

Next was a six-team Gauntlet match in which two tag teams begin the match and are replaced whenever one is eliminated (by pinfall or submission) until there is only one team left.

Next was a tag team match dubbed "Super Joshi Pro Wars 2018" pitting Cassandra Miyagi and Meiko Satomura from Sendai Girls' Pro Wrestling against the team of Maki Itoh and Saki Akai.

Next was a six-man tag team match between All Out (Akito, Shunma Katsumata and Yuki Iino) and #StrongHearts (T-Hawk, El Lindaman and Duan Yingnan).

Next was an intergender tag team match between real life husband and wife Joey Ryan and Laura James, and real life fiancés Makoto Oishi and Misaki Ohata from Pro Wrestling Wave. The match was dubbed "The World's Crazy Couple Battle".

Next was a match sponsored by Souken Holdings dubbed "Eat Or Be Eaten!? Giant Special Single Match" between Super Sasadango Machine and Andreza Giant Panda, a gigantic panda mascot.

Next was a Weapon Rumble match dubbed "The Difference In 27 Years Of Age! Bloodbath Between President (48) and Roster Member (21) — Final and Conclusive Weapon Rumble" in which various weapons secretly chosen by the participants beforehand were being introduced one after another at regular intervals.

Next was Shigehiro Irie send-off match. He teamed up with his Team Dream Futures partner Keisuke Ishii to take on the team of Harashima and Yukio Sakaguchi.

Next, Konosuke Takeshita faced off against Cima.

In the main event, Daisuke Sasaki challenged Danshoku Dino for the KO-D Openweight Championship. Sasaki won the bout and was granted a 2,000,000 yen prize by Good Com Asset, the sponsor of the match.

Results

Rumble rules match

Gauntlet tag team match

References

External links
The official DDT Pro-Wrestling website
Ryōgoku Peter Pan 2018 at ProWrestlingHistory.com

DDT Peter Pan
2018 in professional wrestling
October 2018 events in Japan
Professional wrestling in Tokyo
2018 in Tokyo
Events in Tokyo